Danielle Jessica Colaprico (born May 6, 1993) is an American soccer player who currently plays for San Diego Wave FC of the NWSL. She previously played for NWSL rivals Chicago Red Stars as well as Adelaide United and Sydney FC in the Australian W-League. Colaprico has represented the United States on the under-23 national team and received her first cap to the USWNT in November 2018.

Early life
Colaprico grew up in Freehold Township, New Jersey and attended Red Bank Catholic High School.

College career

Virginia Cavaliers, 2011–2014
Originally from Freehold, New Jersey, Colaprico attended the University of Virginia where she played for the Cavaliers from 2011 to 2014. She finished her collegiate career as the program's all-time leader in assists (44) and appearances (100).

Club career

Chicago Red Stars, 2015–2022
Colaprico was selected by the Chicago Red Stars as the ninth overall pick of the 2015 NWSL College Draft in January 2015. She scored her first goal for the team during a match against Sky Blue FC on May 2 helping Chicago win 1–0. On September 14, 2015, the NWSL announced that Colaprico was voted the NWSL Rookie of the Year, beating fellow finalists Sofia Huerta and Sam Mewis. Colaprico has been named to the NWSL second XI in 2015, 2016 & 2017.

Colaprico departed Red Stars at the end of the 2022 NWSL season.

Loan to Adelaide United, 2016–2018
In October 2016, Colaprico was loaned to Australian club Adelaide United along with her Red Star teammates Katie Naughton and Sofia Huerta. Colaprico re-signed with the club in October 2017, joining her Chicago teammates Katie Naughton and Alyssa Mautz.

Loan to Sydney FC
It was announced on September 28, 2018, that Colaprico would be joining Sydney FC in the W-League for the 2018–2019 season. She was one of four American players joining the club, alongside former Red Stars teammate Sofia Huerta, Aubrey Bledsoe of the Washington Spirit and Savannah McCaskill of Sky Blue FC. Colaprico appeared in 11 games for Sydney. She started both playoff games, helping Sydney win the 2018-19 W-League Championship.

San Diego Wave FC, 2023–

Colaprico signed with San Diego Wave Fútbol Club on December 5, 2022.  She signed a two year deal with the Californian club.

International career
Colaprico has represented the United States at the under-23 level. In February 2015, she scored a goal during the team's 2–0 defeat of Norway at the 2015 Six Nations Tournament in La Manga, Spain. The team won all three of its games at the tournament to win the tournament.

On November 24, 2015, Colaprico was called up to the full national team's training camp in preparation for friendly matches at the end of the victory tour organized to celebrate the winning of the 2015 FIFA Women's World Cup. After a long pause, Colaprico received her second call up to the senior team on October 6, 2016.

Colaprico was included on the preliminary roster for the 2018 CONCACAF Women's Championship but was not named to the final 20-player roster. She received a call-up to USWNT camp in Europe for a pair of friendlies against Portugal and Scotland in November 2018. This was her first call-up in two years. She received her first cap on November 8, 2018, coming on as a second-half substitute against Portugal.

Colaprico was named to the roster for the 2019 SheBelieves Cup but was forced to withdraw due to a groin injury.

Honors

Club
 W-League Championship: 2018–19

References

External links

 
 US Soccer player profile
 Chicago Red Stars player profile
 Virginia Cavaliers player profile

1993 births
Living people
American women's soccer players
National Women's Soccer League players
Chicago Red Stars players
Adelaide United FC (A-League Women) players
Soccer players from New Jersey
People from Freehold Township, New Jersey
Red Bank Catholic High School alumni
Virginia Cavaliers women's soccer players
Women's association football midfielders
Sportspeople from Monmouth County, New Jersey
Expatriate women's soccer players in Australia
Chicago Red Stars draft picks
United States women's international soccer players